Psarou is a beach and village on the island of Mykonos in Greece. The beach is located 4 km from Mykonos town (or Chora) and it is close to Platys Gialos. As of 2011, Psarou had a population of 20.

References

See also
Cyclades

Beaches of Greece
Populated places in Mykonos
Landforms of Mykonos
Landforms of the South Aegean